Karibi Dede, Ph.D. (born May 8, 1983) is an American Football coach and former player who serves as the defensive backs coach at Charlotte. Dede played safety and linebacker for Auburn University before a brief stint in the NFL and CFL.

High School Career
Dede attended C. D. Hylton High School where his team won 39 consecutive games  and back to back 6A Virginia State Titles.

College & Professional Career
Dede played at Auburn where he appeared in 50 games and had 32 starts. As a senior Dede was named a Team Captain. Following his college career Dede was not selected in the  NFL Draft, but was invited by the New York Giants to attend their rookie mini-camp and was subsequently signed as a free-agent by the club. The Giants waived Dede on August 27, 2007. On March 1, 2008, it was announced Dede had signed with the Montreal Alouettes of the CFL. Dede sustained an injury during the preseason and was later waived by the club.

Education
Dede is a graduate of Auburn University where he earned his Bachelors of Arts in Special Education, Masters of Arts in Special Education, and Ph.D. in Administration of Higher Education. Dede's doctoral dissertation examined "the Relationships Among Socioeconomic Status, Learning Disabilities, Academic Competence, and Social Fluency for Division I Student-Athletes."

Honors
During his playing career at Auburn, Dede was selected to the All-SEC Honor Roll in 2003, 2004 and 2005. He was also named the undergraduate student of the year in the College of Education in 2005, and that same year selected as Auburn's nominee for the SEC Good Works Team. In 2006 Dede was named a semifinalist for the William V. Campbell Trophy (Academic Heisman) which is awarded to the American college football player with the best combination of academics, community service, and on-field performance. In 2007 Dede was a selected to the inaugural class of the National Football Foundation National Honor Society, a recognition for players who excel both on the field and in the classroom.

References

External links
NFL.com player profile
Auburn Tigers player profile

1983 births
Living people
People from Woodbridge, Virginia
American football linebackers
Auburn Tigers football players
New York Giants players
Auburn High School (Alabama) people
Hargrave Military Academy alumni